Szczyrk  is a town in the Beskid Śląski mountains of southern Poland, situated in the valley of the Żylica river. It is part of the Silesian Voivodeship (since 1999), previously being part of the Bielsko-Biała Voivodeship (1975–1998). It has a population of 5,734 people (2019).


The town is a popular winter sports centre, with over 60 km of ski runs served by 30 ski lifts. Poland's Winter Olympics athletes train in Szczyrk for events such as skiing and ski jumping.

Moreover, both peaks are accessible to most people in one day's hike via the tourist routes. Skrzyczne is also accessible via a chairlift.

To the west of Szczyrk is Wisła, a town where the source of the Vistula (Wisła) river can be found (around the Barania Góra mountain).

Gallery

Twin towns – sister cities

Szczyrk is twinned with:
 Jászkisér, Hungary (2004)
 Mikołajki, Poland (2007)
 Zetel, Germany (2008)

References

External links
 Official website
 Skiing in Szczyrk
 TrekEarth - photos from Szczyrk
 Detailed site about Szczyrk
 Photo gallery from Szczyrk

Cities and towns in Silesian Voivodeship
Bielsko County
Kingdom of Galicia and Lodomeria
Kraków Voivodeship (1919–1939)
Silesian Beskids
Ski areas and resorts in Poland